The 12th Madras Native Infantry  may refer to:

84th Punjabis which was the 2nd Battalion, 12th Madras Native Infantry in 1797
72nd Punjabis which was called the 12th Madras Native Infantry in 1824